Gabriel Ålgård (5 October 1952 – 14 July 2015) was a Norwegian politician for the Conservative Party.

He served as a deputy representative to the Parliament of Norway from Rogaland during the term 1977–1981. In total he met during 76 days of parliamentary session.

References

1952 births
2015 deaths
Deputy members of the Storting
Conservative Party (Norway) politicians
Rogaland politicians